The following lists events that happened during 2016 in the Tunisian Republic.

Events

January 

 2016 Tunisian protests: Protests erupted in the Kasserine region of Tunisia over unemployment, which later spread to other parts of the country.

March 

 7 March – Battle of Ben Guerdane
 20 March – The Machrouu Tounes political party is founded.

April 

 9 April – The Democratic Party is founded.

August 

 27 August – The Chahed Cabinet led by Prime Minister Youssef Chahed is formed.

December 

 28 December – 2016 Djebel Jelloud train accident: Five people are killed when a bus and a train collide.

Sports 

 The 2016 Tunisian Athletics Championships were held  from 15 to 17 July in Radès, Tunisia.
 Tunisia competed at the 2016 Summer Olympics held in Rio de Janeiro, Brazil from 5 to 21 August 2016.
 Tunisia competed at the 2016 Summer Paralympics held in Rio de Janeiro, Brazil from 7 to 18 September 2016.

References 

 
Years of the 21st century in Tunisia
Tunisia
Tunisia
2010s in Tunisia